The Henry Rollins Show was a weekly talk show hosted by musician Henry Rollins on the Independent Film Channel (IFC). The show featured Rollins' monologues, interviews with celebrities and uncensored musical performances. The show was canceled after the wrap of its second season.

Sections
Each episode features an interview and a music segment. In addition, Rollins' monologues and other short segments are organized into several sections that are shown occasionally throughout the episodes.

Teeing Off
Rollins gives a short social commentary at the beginning of the show.

Letters from Henry
Rollins does a voice-over of humorous/sarcastic open letters he has written to celebrities and politicians.

Rollins Reconsiders
Rollins gives a sarcastically exaggerated "positive" speech, interspersed with humorous imagery (often photo manipulations), in which Rollins "reconsiders" a fad or issue he actually disapproves of.

The Disquisition
Comedian and political activist Janeane Garofalo shares her free-form musings in monologues filmed in her apartment.

Drawing Conclusions
Nine animated monologue segments were produced by Lylofilm for Swift River Productions and IFC during the show's two-year run. Rollins appeared as a stand-up comedian and his spoken word stories were animated with 2D visuals depicting his jokes and performance. The nine animated segments produced were titled: METHOD ACTING (with Danny DeVito); JUNK MAIL; WALL MART; CEDRIC; A TEXAS BARBECUE (with George W. Bush and Saddam Hussein); JESUS (with Jesus Christ); HIS GAY NEIGHBORS; TEEN ALCOHOLICA and NUTS ABOUT HENRY.

IFC Soapbox
Individuals from both sides of a debate (example topics from the show include pornography and same-sex marriage) are given a soapbox on which they can express their views.

End Credits
Rollins draws attention to lesser-known facts regarding historical figures and/or the work of actors and directors.

DVD and iTunes release
Season one was released as a three disc DVD box set on June 5, 2007. Both seasons of the show are available for download from the iTunes Store as of February, 2010.

Episodes
Season 1

Season 2

External links
Official site archived version from 2011 on archive.org, includes streaming video and free audio downloads

American television talk shows
2007 American television series endings
IFC (American TV channel) original programming